Yunnanilus longibarbatus is a species of stone loach. It is endemic to the Hongshui River basin in Guangxi, southern China. It grows to  SL.

References

L
Freshwater fish of China
Endemic fauna of Guangxi
Taxa named by Gan Xi, 
Taxa named by Chen Xiao-Yong
Taxa named by Yang Jun-Xing
Fish described in 2007